Ebrāhim Pourdāvoud  (February 9, 1885 – November 17, 1968) was born in Rasht, Iran, to a mother who was the daughter of a clergyman and a father who was a reputable merchant and landlord. He is one of the most formidable scholars of Iran during the 20th century. Pourdavoud translated Avesta into Persian in six volumes. In addition, he made many other significant contributions to Iranian studies.

Life and career

At 20, Pourdavoud moved to Tehran to study traditional medicine but medicine proved not to be to his liking. In 1908, at the age of 23, he went to Beirut where he studied French literature for two and a half years. He then returned to Iran to visit his family but before long left for France. Here, he published the periodical Iranshahr (the Land of Iran), with the first issue appearing in April 1914 and the fourth and the last issue on the day World War I erupted. During the War, he established himself in Baghdad where he published the periodical Rastakhiz (Resurrection); in total 25 issues of this periodical were published, publication lasting until March 1916. He left Baghdad for Berlin, where he stayed until 1924. His studies in Germany led him to Zoroastrian history and teachings.

After his return to Iran, in 1924, Pourdavoud founded the School of Ancient Languages where he initiated extensive research work concerning ancient history and ancient Iranian languages, especially the Avestan language. In 1945, he founded the Iranology Society and, very soon afterwards, the School of Iranology.

Pourdavoud's many and varied contributions fall into the following categories:
- translation of Avesta,
- investigations into ancient Persian languages, especially the Avestan language,
- interpretation of the contents of Avesta, including elucidation of signs and symbols, as well as terms and expressions used herein,
- studies concerning peoples, animals, plants, and
- research into the history of Iran, giving especial attention to the weapons used by ancient Persians and the methods with which these were used.

Pourdavoud was well-versed in Arabic, English, French, German, and Turkish, in addition to his mother tongue and ancient Persian languages.

Pourdavoud was awarded Germany's highest academic honour by the German President Theodor Heuss in 1955. Soon thereafter, he received the Rabindranath Tagore Medal, which is conferred in recognition of outstanding contributions to literature, from India. In 1965, he received from the representative of Pope Paul VI in Tehran the order of Chevalier Saint Sylvester Pope (Knight of Saint Sylvester Pope).

He was married to a woman of German origin; they had one daughter named Pourandokht. In the morning of November 17, 1968, his family found him dead behind his desk in his study at home.

Notes

External links
 K. Movaghar, Editor-in-Chief, Ebrahim Pourdavoud, Events.
 Bouzarjomehr Parkhideh, Professor Ibrahim Pourdavoud, Author of a Report on Avesta, 2004, Iran Chamber Society.
 A video documentary about Ebrahim Pourdavood, with his daughter, Ms Pourandokht Pourdavood, relating some family history, in Persian, bebin.tv (6 min 11 sec).
 Ebrahim Pourdavoud - Article in Swedish

1885 births
1968 deaths
Iranian scholars
People from Rasht
Iranian expatriates in Germany
Knights of the Order of St. Sylvester
Members of the Academy of Persian Language and Literature
Gilaki people
Linguists of Persian
Linguists from Iran
Translators from Avestan
Zoroastrian studies scholars
20th-century translators
20th-century linguists